Egly-Ouriet   is a Grower Champagne producer.

Francis Egly is the fourth generation in the family business. Egly-Ouriet grand cru vineyards are located in Ambonnay, Verzenay and Bouzy; its premier cru Pinot Meunier vineyards are in Vrigny. Grand cru vineyards are planted to 70 percent Pinot Noir and 30 percent Chardonnay. The domaine chooses 3-4 years of barrel aging of the wine, far longer than most Champagne producers.

Awards and honors
Egly-Ouriet  has received  the highest possible rating of three-stars  in La Revue du vin de France’s Le guide des meilleurs vins de France. A 3-star rating  was awarded to only nine Champagne estates in total, including Selosse and Krug.  Egly-Ouriet has been rated as one of Champagne's top five producers by Andrew Jefford in   The New France.

See also
Classification of Champagne vineyards
Agrapart & Fils

References

Champagne producers